Leo T. Niemuth (1904-1997) was a member of the Wisconsin State Assembly.

Biography
Niemuth was born on April 17, 1904 in Oshkosh, Wisconsin. He died on September 5, 1997.

Career
Niemuth was a member of the Assembly from 1937 to 1942. He was a Republican.

References

Politicians from Oshkosh, Wisconsin
Republican Party members of the Wisconsin State Assembly
1904 births
1997 deaths
20th-century American politicians